Malick Fofana (born 31 March 2005) is a Belgian professional footballer who plays as a forward for Gent.

Club career 
Fofana started playing football at Eendracht Aalst before joining the KAA Gent as an under-9. There, he signed his first professional contract in January 2022.

Having already partook in the pre-season friendlies, Fofana made his professional debut for Gent on the 30 July 2022, replacing Hugo Cuypers during a 1–1 home Division 1A draw against Koninklijke. Only a week later, he was awarded his first start against Westerlo, leading his team to a 2–1 home win.

International career 
Of Guinean descent, Fofana is a youth international for Belgium, establishing himself as a regular goalscorer with the under-17, with whom he played the 2022 Euro.

References

External links

2005 births
Living people
Belgian footballers
Belgium youth international footballers
Association football forwards
Sportspeople from Aalst, Belgium
Footballers from East Flanders
K.A.A. Gent players
Belgian Pro League players
Belgian people of Guinean descent